The 2022 Davis Cup was the 110th edition of the Davis Cup, a tournament between national teams in men's tennis. It is sponsored by Rakuten. The Russian Tennis Federation were the defending champions, but they and Belarus were eliminated from competing in international events due to the 2022 Russian invasion of Ukraine.

Davis Cup Finals

Date: 13–18 September 2022 (group stage)23–27 November 2022 (knockout stage)
Venue: Unipol Arena, Bologna, ItalyEmirates Arena, Glasgow, Great BritainAm Rothenbaum, Hamburg, GermanyPavelló Municipal Font de Sant Lluís, Valencia, SpainMartin Carpena Arena, Malaga, Spain
Surface: Indoor Hard

16 nations took part in the finals. The qualification was as follows:
 1 finalists of the previous edition (defending champion Russia was suspended)
 1 highest-ranked losing semi-finalist of the previous edition (announced by ITF on 13 March 2022 as Serbia to replace Russia)
 2 wild card teams (announced by ITF on 5 December 2021 as Serbia and Great Britain, Canada were later given Serbia’s subsequently vacant wildcard 
 12 winners of a qualifier round, in March 2022

H = Host Nation, TH = Title-Holder, 2021F = Finalist from the 2021 tournament, 2021SF = Highest-ranked losing semi-finalist from the 2021 tournament, WC = Wild Card

Seeds
The seedings were based on the Davis Cup Ranking of 7 March 2022.

Qualifying round

Date: 4–5 March 2022

Twenty-six eligible teams were:
 16 teams ranked 3rd-18th in the Finals.
 8 winning teams from World Group I.
 2 winning teams from World Group I Knock-out ties.

The remaining 24 nations competed for 12 spots in the Finals.

The 12 winning teams from the play-offs played at the Finals and the 12 losing teams played at the World Group I.

Qualified teams

  (#1)
  (#3)
  (#4)
  (#5)
  (#6)
  (#8)
  (#9)
  (#11)
  (#12)
  (#14)
  (#15)
  (#16)
 
  (#17)
  (#18)
  (#19)
  (#20)
  (#23)
  (#24)
  (#26)
  (#27)
  (#29)
  (#32)
  (#41)
  (#44)

Group stage

G = Group, T = Ties, M = Matches, S = Sets, H = Hosts

Knockout stage

World Group I

Date: 15–18 September 2022

Twenty-four teams participated in the World Group I, in series decided on a home and away basis. 

These twenty-four teams were:
 11 losing teams from Qualifying round, in March 2022
 12 winning teams from World Group I Play-offs, in March 2022
 1 highest-ranked losing team from World Group I Play-offs (Uzbekistan)

#: Nations Ranking as of 7 March 2022.

Seeded teams
  (#16)
  (#17)
  (#18)
  (#19)
  (#22)
  (#23)
  (#24)
  (#25)
  (#26)
  (#27)
  (#28)
  (#29)

Unseeded teams
  (#30)
  (#31)
  (#32)
  (#33)
  (#34)
  (#35)
  (#36)
  (#37)
  (#38)
  (#39)
  (#40)
  (#45)

Qualifying round

Date: 4–5 March 2022

Twenty-four teams played for twelve spots in the World Group I, in series decided on a home and away basis.

These twenty-four teams were:
 2 losing teams from World Group I Knock-out ties.
 12 losing teams from World Group I.
 8 winning teams from World Group II.
 2 winning teams from World Group II Knock-out ties.

The 12 winning teams from the play-offs played at the World Group I and the 12 losing teams played at the World Group II.

#: Nations Ranking as of 20 September 2021.

Qualified teams

  (#21)
  (#22)
  (#25)
  (#28)
  (#29)
  (#31)
  (#33)
  (#34)
  (#35)
  (#36)
  (#37)
  (#38)

  (#39)
  (#40)
  (#43)
  (#45)
  (#46)
  (#47)
  (#49)
  (#51)
  (#52)
  (#54)
  (#56)
  (#57)

World Group II

Date: 16–18 September 2022

Twenty-four teams participated in the World Group II, in series decided on a home and away basis. 

These twenty-four teams were:
 10 losing teams from World Group I Play-offs, in March 2022
 12 winning teams from World Group II Play-offs, in March 2022
 2 highest-ranked losing teams from World Group II Play-offs (China PR and Thailand)

#: Nations Ranking as of 7 March 2022.

Seeded teams
  (#41)
  (#42)
  (#43)
  (#44)
  (#46)
  (#47)
  (#48)
  (#49)
  (#50)
  (#51)
  (#52)
  (#53)

Unseeded teams
  (#54)
  (#55)
  (#56)
  (#57)
  (#58)
  (#59)
  (#60)
  (#61)
  (#62)
  (#63)
  (#64)
  (#65)

Qualifying round

Date: 4–5 March 2022

Twenty-four teams played for twelve spots in the World Group II, in series decided on a home and away basis.

These twenty-four teams were:
 2 losing teams from World Group II Knock-out ties.
 12 losing teams from World Group II.
 10 teams from their Group III zone:
 3 from Europe
 3 from Asia/Oceania,
 2 from Americas, and
 2 from Africa.

The 12 winning teams from the play-offs played at the World Group II and the 12 losing teams played at the Group III of the corresponding continental zone.

#: Nations Ranking as of 20 September 2021.

Qualified teams

  (#42)
  (#48)
  (#50)
  (#53)
  (#55)
  (#58)
  (#59)
  (#60)
  (#61)
  (#62)
  (#63)
  (#64)

  (#65)
  (#66)
  (#67)
  (#68)
  (#69)
  (#70)
  (#71)
  (#75)
  (#77)
  (#79=)
  (#79=)
  (#81)

Americas Zone

Group III

Dates: 22–25 June 2022

Location: Costa Rica Country Club, Escazú, Costa Rica (Hard)

The top three nations were promoted to the 2023 Davis Cup World Group II Play-offs and the last two nations were relegated to 2023 Americas Zone Group IV

Teams

 
  (Host)
 
 

 
 
 
 

Promotions/Relegations
 ,  and  qualify for the 2023 Davis Cup World Group II Play-offs

Group IV

Dates: 1–6 August 2022

Location:  National Racquet Centre, Tacarigua, Trinidad & Tobago (Hard) 

The top two nations were promoted to the 2023 Davis Cup Americas Zone Group III

Teams

 
 
 
 
 

 
 
  (Host)
 

Inactive Team

Promotions

Asia/Oceania Zone

Group III

Dates: 10–13 August 2022

Location: Hai Dang Tennis Club, Tây Ninh, Vietnam (Hard)

The top three nations were promoted to the 2023 Davis Cup World Group II Play-offs and the last two nations were relegated to 2023 Asia/Oceania Zone Group IV

Teams

 
 
 
 

 
 
 
  (Host)

Promotions/Relegations
 ,  and  qualify for the 2023 Davis Cup World Group II Play-offs

Group IV

Dates: 8–13 August 2022 and 17–22 October 2022

Location: Sri Lanka Tennis Association Courts, Colombo, Sri Lanka (Clay) and Bahrain Tennis Federation, Isa Town, Bahrain (Hard)

The top two nations will be promoted to the 2023 Davis Cup Asia/Oceania Zone Group III

Teams

  (Host)
 
 
 
 
 
 
 
 

 
 
 
 
  (Host)
 
 

Withdrawn/Inactive Teams

 
 
 

  (Suspended)
 
 

Promotions/Relegations
  and  qualify for the 2023 Davis Cup Asia/Oceania Zone Group III.

Europe Zone

Group III

Dates: 22–25 June 2022

Location: Tennis Club Bellevue, Ulcinj, Montenegro (Clay)

The top three nations were promoted to the 2023 Davis Cup World Group II Play-offs and the last two nations were relegated to 2023 Europe Zone Group IV

Teams

 
 
 
 

 
 
  (Host)
 

Promotions/Relegations
 ,  and  qualify for the 2023 Davis Cup World Group II Play-offs

Group IV

Dates: 27–30 July 2022

Location: Baku Tennis Academy, Baku, Azerbaijan (Hard)

The top two nations were promoted to the 2023 Davis Cup Europe Zone Group III

Teams

 
 
  (Host)
 

 
 
 

Promotions

Africa Zone

Group III

Dates: 10–13 August 2022

Location: Tennis Club de Bachdjarah, Algiers, Algeria (Clay)

The top three nations were promoted to the 2023 Davis Cup World Group II Play-offs and the last two nations were relegated to 2023 Africa Zone Group IV

Teams

  (Host)
 
 
 

 
 
 
 

Promotions/Relegations
 ,  and  qualify for the 2023 Davis Cup World Group II Play-offs

Group IV

Dates: 4–9 July 2022 and 27–30 July 2022

Location: Ecology Tennis Club, Kigali, Rwanda (Clay) and MUNDI Sport Complex, Yaoundé, Cameroon (Hard)

The top two nations were promoted to the 2023 Davis Cup Africa Zone Group III

Teams

 
 
 
  (Host)
 
 
 
 
 

 
 
  (Host)
 
 
 
 
 

Inactive Teams

Promotions

References

External links
Official website

 
Davis Cup
Davis Cups by year